This is a list of player movements for Super Rugby teams prior to the end of the 2021 Super Rugby season. Departure and arrivals of all players that were included in a Super Rugby squad for 2020 or 2021 are listed here, regardless of when it occurred. Future-dated transfers are only included if confirmed by the player or his agent, his former team or his new team.

In addition to the main squad, teams can also name additional players that train in backup or development squads for the franchises. These players are denoted by (wider training group) for New Zealand teams, or (development squad) for Australian teams.

Notes
 2020 players listed are all players that were named in the initial senior squad, or subsequently included in a 23-man match day squad at any game during the season.
 (did not play) denotes that a player did not play at all during one of the two seasons due to injury or non-selection. These players are included to indicate they were contracted to the team. For the 2020 season, Super Rugby was suspended after 7 rounds of matches due to the COVID-19 pandemic, with regional tournaments taking place there after. Players listed as 'did not play' did not feature in any of the 7 rounds of matches played that season.
 (short-term) denotes that a player wasn't initially contracted, but came in during the season. This could either be a club rugby player coming in as injury cover, or a player whose contract had expired at another team (typically in the northern hemisphere).
 Flags are only shown for players moving to or from another country.
 Players may play in several positions, but are listed in only one.

Argentina

Jaguares

The Jaguares were not named in a Super Rugby season in 2021. They had been rumoured to be joining an expanded Súper Liga Americana de Rugby competition, but were not named in the 2021 season of the tournament. The Jaguares won't play in 2021 and all players will depart the team either overseas, or enter the draft for the 2021 Súper Liga Americana de Rugby season.

Australia

Japan

Sunwolves

In March 2019, the Japan Rugby Football Union announced that the Sunwolves Super Rugby licence would be discontinued, after failing to negotiate a new contract with SANZAAR for the 2021 season due to financial considerations.

New Zealand

South Africa

See also

 List of 2020–21 Premiership Rugby transfers
 List of 2020–21 Pro14 transfers
 List of 2020–21 Top 14 transfers
 List of 2020–21 RFU Championship transfers
 List of 2020–21 Major League Rugby transfers
 SANZAAR
 Super Rugby franchise areas

References

2020
2020 Super Rugby season
2021 Super Rugby season